Ingeborg Körner is a Namibian-born German actress.

Selected filmography
 Dangerous Guests (1949)
 Unknown Sender (1950)
 Abundance of Life (1950)
 The House in Montevideo (1951)
 Toxi (1952)
 When The Village Music Plays on Sunday Nights (1953)
 Not Afraid of Big Animals (1953)
 The Rose of Stamboul (1953)
 The Perfect Couple (1954)
 My Leopold (1955)

External links

1929 births
Living people
White Namibian people
Namibian people of German descent
German film actresses
German television actresses
People from Keetmanshoop
20th-century German actresses